Thomas Andersson (born 3 September 1968) is a retired Swedish football defender.

References

1968 births
Living people
Swedish footballers
Örebro SK players
Association football defenders
Allsvenskan players
Place of birth missing (living people)